Podil or the Lower city is a historic neighborhood in Kyiv, the capital of Ukraine. It is located on a floodplain terrace over the Dnieper between the Kyiv Hills and the lower stream of Pochaina River. Podil is one of the oldest neighborhoods of Kyiv, and the birthplace of the city's trade, commerce and industry. After the Mongol invasion of Rus' and destruction of Kyiv, it served as a city center until the 19th century. Here the city administration (magistrate) and the main university were located, and later the city's port and shipyard were established here.

Podil contains many architectural and historical landmarks, and new archaeological sites are still being revealed. It is a part of the city's larger administrative Podilskyi District.

History

The name “Podil” means something that is situated downwards. This area used to be the trading and crafting center of Kyiv. The names of some Podil neighborhoods reflect this fact: "Dehtyari" (those who work with tar), "Honchari" (potters), "Kozhemyaki" (craftsmen working with leather). On the territory of Podil ancient constructions were found. Some of them date back to the first half of the first millennium BC. It is first mentioned, however, in chronicles around 945. At times of Ancient Rus, Podil served as the main city's posad which was connected with the Upper city (Old Kyiv Hill) by Borychiv Descent. According to archaeological data, Podil appeared at the end of the 9th century. In 12-13th centuries its total area was reaching . In documentary sources there is mention of "Stolpiye" (wooden fortifications) that protected Podil from northwest, Fairgrounds (later Zhytniy Fairgrounds, main city market), Church of Saint Elijah (the oldest Christian temple mentioned in 945), and Pyrohoshcha Church. Probably, the legendary churches of Turov and Novgorod also existed at Podil. The Soviet "Outline of Ancient History of the Ukrainian SSR" of 1957 mentions that the Novgorod traders had own church in Kyiv. The Pochaina River served the city's harbour.

Podil has accumulated a cultural layer built up of  saturated with a great abundance of artefacts of 9–18th centuries. Its uniqueness consists of the fact that in its lower strata due to high soil moisture are well-preserved objects of organic matter such as wooden structures. There were researched residential and commercial buildings (predominantly above-ground blockhouses), craftsman shops, port warehouses, burial grounds, segments of streets. There were discovered remnants of five masonry temples of the 12th century. It was established that Podil had built-up manors with consistent courtyard limits. Each resident's manor that had area of  consisted of 2-3 buildings.

After the Mongol invasion of Rus' and destruction of Kyiv, Podil transformed into the main and the most populated part of the city. However, the area of Podil shrank, in 16-17th centuries its northwestern border served the Hlybochytsia River that used to drain into Pochaina (today Hlybochytsia in the underground collector).

Upon obtaining its Magdeburg rights in the 15th century, in Kyiv was built a rathaus, later Kyiv magistrate. The center of Podil became the market square later known as Mahistratska and Konstraktova where stood a rathaus and the city's cathedral Pyrohoshcha Church. The first "hostynnyi dvir" (trading courtyard) is known as early as the mid 16th century. In the 15th century there was established the Convent of St Florus. At the beginning of the 17th century, there was established Epiphany Monastery of the Kyiv Orthodox Brotherhood, which also later contained the Kyiv Mohyla Academy. Until middle of the 17th century there was an Armenian community in Podil with its own Church of the Nativity of the Virgin. Also during the first half of the 17th century two Roman Catholic places of worship were built in stone, the cathedral church that was destroyed in the 1660s and its remnants found during archaeological excavations and a cathedral of the Dominican Monastery of St Nicholas that existed in 1400s-1649 and at end of the 17th century became the Orthodox cathedral of the Monastery of Sts Peter and Paul.

In 1667 under the Truce of Andrusovo, Kyiv was officially ceded to the Tsardom of Muscovy. Intensive building within Podil took place in the 17th century. An annual fair was held from 1797 to 1929 at the Kontraktova Square (Square of Contracts). Before the building of the Contract House, the Kontraktova Square was known as Mahistratska Square. At the western end of the square was the Pyrohoshcha Church mentioned in the 12th century epic poem The Tale of Igor's Campaign. Following traditions of medieval cities, in the 18th century a rotunda was built along with a fountain of the Roman goddess Felicitas in front of the magistracy was built. In 19th century the fountain was reattributed to Samson. The fountain became the first hydro-engineering structure at Podil. Not far from Kontraktova Square at Podil were the Zhytniy (Rye) Fairgrounds that existed at least since the 15th century where  the main Roman Catholic cathedral Kosciol of Virgin Mary was located.

Before the Great Podil fire of 1811 it was the most populous neighborhood of the city with 2,068 houses out of 3,672 dwellings in all of Kyiv. The fire damaged the neighborhood extensively and changed the appearance of Podil dramatically. After the fire, Podil was newly planned and a large number of new streets appeared on the project of Scottish architect William Heste and Russian architect Andrey Melensky, which still exist today. At this time such buildings as the Contract's House (1817), Hostynnyi Dvir the shopping arcade and other buildings were constructed. The Contracts House was built in 1817 where at its ground level were signed contracts and treaties, while the second floor hall hosting concerts.

In 1835 the Kyiv magistrate was disassembled on bricks which were used for finishing the building of Hostynnyi Dvir and Contracts House, while in its place was created a small city park. In 1938 in the park was placed a British tank Mark V that was taken as a trophy during the Russian Civil War from the Russian White Guards. The tank also remained at the park a few years after the World War II. Later in 1977 in the park was built a monument of Hryhoriy Skovoroda.

The Kyiv tramway was among the first in the Russian Empire. The tram commuting started at Podil among the first in Kyiv in 1896. It originally was connecting Kontraktova Square and Poshtova Square and later stretched to Kurenivka and then Pushcha-Vodytsia.

Until World War II, the section just north of Nyzhniy Val street was called Ploska chast or Ploskaya sloboda. It was home to many poor Jews who lived there in wretched conditions.

Landmarks (attractions)
Numerous tourist attractions (also officially designated as landmarks) of Podil particularly include:
 Frolivsky Convent
 National University of Kyiv-Mohyla Academy
 House of Ivan Mazepa
 House of Peter the Great
 Fountain of Samson
 Zamkova Hora hill (Castle Hill)
 Hostynnyi Dvir (Hosting courtyard)
 Pyrohoshcha Church

Lost landmarks
 House of the Kyiv magistrate (the Kyiv Rathaus)
 Kyiv Brotherhood Monastery Epiphany Cathedral
 Church of Nicholas the Good
 Church of the Resurrection
 Church of the Saint Boris and Gleb (Borys and Hlib)
 Church of the Apostles Peter and Paul
 Church of the Saint Constantine and Yelena (Kostiantyn and Olena)
 Greek Church of the Saint Catherine

Transport

Podil is connected to the city's metro system by the following three stations on the Obolonsko–Teremkivska line: Tarasa Shevchenka, Kontraktova Ploshcha (named after the Kontraktova Square) and Poshtova Ploshcha (named after the Poshtova Square).

The Kyiv Funicular provides passenger traffic between Podil and the city's historic Uppertown neighborhood, today it is mostly used by tourists. Some time ago, the Kyiv River Port served passenger traffic on the Dnipro River, but only tourists' excursion boats are available there nowadays.

Streets and squares
 Andriyivskyy Descent
 Borychiv Descent
 Poshtova Square
 Kontraktova Square

See also
 Monument to the Magdeburg Rights (Kyiv)

Further reading

References

External links

 podilr.gov.ua - Administration website of the Podilskyi District 
 Поділ in Wiki-Encyclopedia Kyiv 
 klymenko.data-tec.net - Photo gallery and information about Podil and its attractions 
 Historical photos of Podil 

Neighborhoods in Kyiv
Tourist attractions in Kyiv
Podilskyi District